The Rhondda Tramways Company was established in 1906 as a subsidiary of the National Electric Construction Company.  The NECC was acquired, with all its subsidiary businesses, by British Electric Traction Company (BET) in 1928. In the late 19th and early 20th centuries the BET was a major operator of tramways in the UK, and later became one of the biggest operators of motor buses in the UK.

History
The Rhondda Tramways Company was given the franchise under act of parliament to run trams within the boundaries of the Rhondda Urban District Council. The council itself was prohibited from running its own bus service. In the early 1930s the trams were replaced by diesel buses.

By 1956 Rhondda Transport operated over 200 buses, and shortly afterwards it became the largest bus operator in Wales. In 1971 the company was taken over by Western Welsh. Western Welsh was merged with Red & White to form National Welsh, a component company of the newly created and nationalised National Bus Company (NBC).

Subsequent developments
NBC was privatised under prime minister Margaret Thatcher's privatisation campaigns in 1986. National Welsh was sold to its management and began a vigorous expansionist drive, taking over smaller local and municipal bus companies in the South Wales valleys. It collapsed in 1992, and the former Rhondda Transport operations were taken over by Rhondda Buses. This company was taken over by the Stagecoach Group in 1997, and the erstwhile RTC now operates as Stagecoach Wales.

References

Former bus operators in Wales
1906 establishments in Wales
Transport companies established in 1902
British companies established in 1906
Railway companies established in 1906